Tumbleweed Communications Corp. provided secure messaging and secure file transfer solutions for enterprise and government customers. Tumbleweed Communications merged with Axway in 2008.

Tumbleweed products were used to block security threats, protect information, and conduct business online. Tumbleweed provided solutions for inbound and outbound email protection, secure file routing, and identity validation that allow organizations to conduct business over the Internet. Tumbleweed offered these solutions in three product suites: MailGate, SecureTransport, and Validation Authority. MailGate provides protection against spam, viruses, and attacks, and enables policy-based message filtering, encryption, and routing. SecureTransport enables customers to safely exchange large files and transactions without proprietary software. Validation Authority determines the validity of digital certificates.

Tumbleweed has approximately 2,300 enterprise and government customers. Their traditional market focus has been in the financial services, health care, and government markets.

Merger
 Axway Acquired Tumbleweed in early June 2008.
 Tumbleweed Acquired Corvigo in 2004. With the acquisition, Tumbleweed gained the Linux-based anti-spam appliance MailGate.
 Tumbleweed Acquired Valicert in 2003. The Valicert SecureTransport product was added to Tumbleweed's security suite.
 Tumbleweed acquired Worldtalk in 2000.

Revenue
In 2005, Tumbleweed earned approximately $US 50 million in gross revenue from the sale of their products and services.  Of that, approximately $US 3 million was from licensing their patents.
In 2006, Tumbleweed reported $US 62 million in revenue, with revenue growth over one year of 24%.
In 2007, Tumbleweed reported $US 57.50 million in revenue, with revenue growth over one year of -7.30%.

Awards 
In January 2007, Tumbleweed's MailGate 5550 was named SC Magazine’s  Best of 2006 "Recommended" award in the Anti-Spam category.

Patents
Tumbleweed has a patent portfolio including 22 utility patents and one issued US design patent.

US patent 6192407 is one of several owned by Tumbleweed that relates to document delivery systems that generate a unique URL for intended recipients of a document in order to deliver that document. Tumbleweed has licensed this and related patents in their patent portfolio to 29 companies.  They have filed several  patent infringement lawsuits.  Those that have been sued include:
PayPal, This suit has been settled. Terms of the settlement have not been disclosed.
Hallmark Cards, This suit has been settled.  Hallmark agreed to take a license.
Yahoo! and HSBC Bank USA, This suit has been settled.  The terms have been described by Yahoo! and HSBC lawyers as favorable to Yahoo! and HSBC.
DST Systems and NewRiver This suit has been settled.  DST Systems and NewRiver will pay Tumbleweed four cents for each delivery of electronic information using a personalized, trackable URL.

Overall, Tumbleweed earns about 6% of its revenue from patent licensing.

Competitors 
Major competitors of Tumbleweed include:
Sterling Commerce
Trend Micro
Zix

Representative customers
Representative customers of Tumbleweed include:
UBS
Bank of America
JPMorgan Chase
The Regence Group
Aetna

See also
 List of software patents

References

External links

Information technology companies of the United States
Companies based in Redwood City, California